The 2016 United States Senate election in Kansas was held on November 8, 2016, to elect a member of the United States Senate to represent the State of Kansas, concurrently with the 2016 U.S. presidential election, as well as other elections to the United States Senate in other states and elections to the United States House of Representatives and various state and local elections. The primaries were held on August 2.

Incumbent Republican Senator Jerry Moran won re-election to a second term in office.

Republican primary

Candidates

Declared
 Jerry Moran, incumbent Senator
 D.J. Smith, former Osawatomie City Councilwoman and candidate for the U.S. Senate in 2014

Declined
 Mike Pompeo, U.S. Representative
 Tim Huelskamp, U.S. Representative
 Todd Tiahrt, former U.S. Representative and candidate for the U.S. Senate in 2010
 Milton Wolf, radiologist and candidate for the U.S. Senate in 2014

Polling

Results

Democratic primary

Candidates

Declared
 Patrick Wiesner, attorney and candidate for the U.S. Senate in 2010 and 2014
 Monique Singh-Bey, member of Universal African Peoples Organization

Declined
 Carl Brewer, former Mayor of Wichita
 Paul Davis, former Minority Leader of the Kansas House of Representatives and nominee for Governor of Kansas in 2014
 Dan Glickman, former U.S. Representative and former United States Secretary of Agriculture
 Jill Docking, businesswoman, former member of the Kansas Board of Regents, nominee for the U.S. Senate in 1996 and nominee for Lieutenant Governor in 2014
 Greg Orman, businessman and Independent candidate for the U.S. Senate in 2014
 Joe Reardon, former Mayor of Kansas City and Wyandotte County
 Kathleen Sebelius, former United States Secretary of Health and Human Services and former Governor of Kansas
 Jim Slattery, former U.S. Representative and nominee for U.S. Senate in 2008
 Margie Wakefield, attorney and nominee for Kansas's 2nd congressional district in 2014

Results

Libertarian primary

Candidates

Declared
 Robert Garrard, nominee for KS-02 in 2008

Independent

Candidates

Declined
 Greg Orman, businessman and Independent candidate for the U.S. Senate in 2014

General election

Predictions

Polling 

with Monique Singh-Bey

with Kathleen Sebelius

Results

References

External links
Official campaign websites
 Jerry Moran (R) for Senate
 Patrick Wiesner (D) for Senate

2016
United States Senate
Kansas